William Darrell may refer to:

William Darrell of Littlecote (1539–1589), MP for Downton
William Darrell (Jesuit) (1651–1721), English Jesuit theologian and writer
William Darell (clergyman), also spelled Darrell, (d. after 1580), English Anglican clergyman and antiquarian

See also
 William Darell (disambiguation)